Panactum or Panakton was a fortress in ancient Attica. 

The site of Panactum is located between modern Panakto and Prasino (formerly, Kavasala).

References

Populated places in ancient Attica
Former populated places in Greece